Caryocolum viscariella is a moth of the family Gelechiidae. It is found in Ireland, Great Britain, Fennoscandia, Denmark, Germany, France, Switzerland, Austria, Hungary, Italy, Estonia and Russia. 

The wingspan is about 12 mm. The forewings are dark brown, mottled with light brown. There are indistinct black markings. Adults are on wing from June to July in one generation per year.

The larvae feed on Silene dioica, Silene alba and Lychnis viscaria. They initially feed in a spun shoot of their host plant. Later, it lives in the central stem of host plant. The larvae can be found from April to June.

References

Moths described in 1855
viscariella
Moths of Europe